South Park station may refer to:

 South Park station (GCRTA), a RTA Rapid Transit Green Line station in Shaker Heights, Ohio (Greater Cleveland)
 South Park station (PAAC), a Pittsburgh Light Rail Blue Line station in Bethel Park, Pennsylvania (Greater Pittsburgh)